William Weightman Valk (October 12, 1806September 20, 1879) was a soldier in the American Civil War and a U.S. Congressman.

In 1830, Valk earned a degree in medicine, graduating from the University of South Carolina at Columbia in 1830. He opened a practice in Connecticut. He joined the Navy during the Mexican–American War and became chief surgeon on the USS Constellation. Valk joined the California Gold Rush in 1849 and, upon failure, opened a practice on Long Island. From March 4, 1855, to March 3, 1857, Valk served in New York's 1st District in the United States House of Representatives.

Finally settled in Flushing, New York, and continued the practice of medicine until elected to Congress. He was elected as a candidate serving in New York's 1st District, as a member of the American Party to the Thirty-fourth Congress (March 4, 1855 – March 3, 1857). He was an unsuccessful candidate for reelection.   Upon the breakout of Civil War, he volunteered as chief surgeon of the 2nd Maryland (USA) Volunteer Infantry of the Union Army. He later became a pension office clerk in Washington, D.C. He was interred in Flushing Cemetery.

References
 Retrieved on 2009-04-24
  Retrieved on 2014-06-25

1806 births
1879 deaths
Politicians from Charleston, South Carolina
Know-Nothing members of the United States House of Representatives from New York (state)
Union Army surgeons
People of Maryland in the American Civil War
University of South Carolina alumni
19th-century American politicians
United States Navy Medical Corps officers